William Stevenson (1741–1821) was an English publisher and author.

Life
The eldest son of the Rev. Seth Ellis Stevenson, rector of Treswell, Nottinghamshire, William Stevenson was a printer and publisher at the firm being Stevenson, Matchett, & Stevenson in the marketplace of Norwich. For 35 years (from 1785 or 1786 onward) he was the proprietor of the Norfolk Chronicle.

Stevenson contributed to John Nichols's Literary Anecdotes and to the Gentleman's Magazine. He was a fellow of the Society of Antiquaries of London. He died in Surrey Street, Norwich, on 13 May 1821. The antiquary Seth William Stevenson was his son.

Publications
In 1812 Stevenson manufactured with his own press a new edition of James Bentham's History of the Church of Ely. In 1817 he published a Supplement to this work. William Stevenson also edited John Campbell's Lives of the British Admirals, updating to 1812 the information contained in it.

Notes

Attribution

1741 births
1821 deaths
English printers
English publishers (people)
Fellows of the Society of Antiquaries of London
People from Norwich